André Planson (10 April 1898 – 29 September 1981) was a French painter. His work was part of the painting event in the art competition at the 1924 Summer Olympics.

References

Further reading
 Planson: la nature, Raymond Charmet, Éditeur International Art Book, 1970
 André Planson: Avec une biographie, une bibliographie et une documentation complète sur le peintre et son œuvre, Pierre Mac Orlan, vol. 32 of Peintres et Sculpteurs d'hier et d'aujourd'hui, Éditeur P. Cailler, 1954
 Musée Galliéra: René Durey, 1890-1959, peintre. André Planson, peintre. Raymond Martin sculpteur. 22 janvier-22 février 1960, Éditeur I.C.C. impr., 1960
 André Planson: cinquante ans de peinture, exposition du 19 mai au 24 juin 1972 à la Galerie des Granges, Genève, Éditeur Galerie des Granges, 1972

External links
 "André Planson", Bénézit Dictionary of Artists, Oxford Art Online, 2011  (subscription required)
 Le Delarge: PLANSON, André
 RKDartist: André Planson

1898 births
1981 deaths
19th-century French painters
20th-century French painters
20th-century French male artists
French male painters
Olympic competitors in art competitions
People from La Ferté-sous-Jouarre
19th-century French male artists